Nothing Feels Natural is the debut studio album by American punk rock band Priests. It was released through Sister Polygon Records on January 27, 2017.

Critical reception

Nothing Feels Natural received an average score of 83 based on 13 reviews on Metacritic, indicating "universal acclaim".

Accolades

Track listing

Personnel

Priests
 Katie Alice Greer – vocals
 Daniele Daniele – drums
 G.L. Jaguar – guitar
 Taylor Mulitz – bass, guitar (on "JJ", "Nothing Feels Natural", "Suck")

Additional musicians
 Janel Leppin – cello, mellotron, pedal steel guitar, electronics
 Luke Stewart – alto saxophone
 Mark Cisneros – bass clarinet, tenor saxophone, vibraphone, percussion
 Perry Fustero – piano
 Brendan Polmer – tambourine
 Kevin Erickson – percussion, Rhodes, guitar
 Hugh McElroy – bass, synthesizer

Technical personnel
 Kevin Erickson – producer
 Hugh McElroy – engineer
 Don Godwin – mixing
 T.J. Lipple – mastering

References

Sister Polygon Records albums
Priests (band) albums
2017 albums